Majed Al-Jaaferi (born 25 February 1986) is a Saudi football player who played in the Pro League for Najran.

References

1986 births
Living people
Saudi Arabian footballers
Al-Hamadah Club players
Najran SC players
Al-Washm Club players
Saudi First Division League players
Saudi Professional League players
Saudi Second Division players
Association football midfielders